Henry Simms (1804 – 1 May 1872) was an English organist and composer.

Background

Henry Simms was born in 1804, the son of Jesse Simms. He studied pianoforte under Ignaz Moscheles.

He was chorus master for the Birmingham Choral Society from 1842, following in the place of the late George Hollins.  He was famous as an extempore player, and widely known as a teacher of pianoforte and singing.

He had two sons, both of whom were also organists:
Robert Henry Simms (1829-1856)
Edward Bishop Simms (1833-1913)

He died on 1 May 1872.

Appointments
Organist of Holy Trinity Church, Bordesley 1825 - 1872
Organist of St Philip's Church, Birmingham 1829  - 1871

Compositions

His compositions were chiefly teaching pieces for pianoforte and songs ; but he also wrote a Communion Service.

References

1804 births
1872 deaths
English organists
British male organists
English composers
19th-century British composers
19th-century English musicians
19th-century British male musicians
19th-century organists